Ziba Cary Keith  (13 July 1842 – 5 April 1909) was a Massachusetts businessman and politician who served in both houses of the Massachusetts Legislature, as the first, third, and seventh Mayor of Brockton, Massachusetts and as a member of the Massachusetts Executive Council.

Keith was born on July 13, 1842 in Brockton, Massachusetts when it was known as North Bridgewater, Massachusetts.    
Keith was educated in the local schools and at the Pierce Academy in Middleborough, Massachusetts.

Keith married Abbie F. Jackson, daughter of Oliver Jackson, on July 13, 1865.

In December 1881 Keith was elected the first mayor of Brockton, Massachusetts, he was sworn in on the first Monday in January 1882.

He died in 1909 after a short illness.

See also
 1875 Massachusetts legislature
 1876 Massachusetts legislature

References

1842 births
Mayors of Brockton, Massachusetts
Republican Party Massachusetts state senators
Republican Party members of the Massachusetts House of Representatives
1909 deaths
19th-century American politicians